Andrea Kalavská, (née  Augustínová (born 28 November 1977 in Trenčín) is a Slovak physicist and politician. She served as the Minister  of Health between 2018-2019. Prior to that she served as a State Secretary at the Health Ministry under minister Tomáš Drucker. On 9 December 2019, she resigned after her healthcare reform proposals failed the approval process in the parlimaent. Following the 2020 Slovak parliamentary election, she served as a special advisor to the Prime Minister Igor Matovič for handling the COVID-19 pandemic.

Early life 
Kalavská graduated in Medicine from the Comenius University in 2003. She obtained her Phd in public health from the University of Trnava and Master of Health Administration from the Slovak Medical University. As a doctor, she worked at hospitals in Trnava and Bratislava.  She teaches at the Slovak Medical University.

References

Living people
1977 births
Slovak politicians
Slovak academics
People from Trenčín
Health ministers of Slovakia
Women government ministers of Slovakia
Comenius University alumni
21st-century Slovak physicians